Yanshiping is a small town physically situated in the southwest of Qinghai province, China. However, it is under the jurisdiction of Amdo County in the Nagqu Prefecture of the Tibet Autonomous Region.

The town is situated on the Qinghai-Tibet Highway. The principal industries include transport, animal husbandry and tourism.

Administrative divisions
The township-level division contains seven village committees and one neighborhood which are as follows:
	
Yanshiping Neighborhood 	
Zhukouma Village 
Naqianma Village 
Bumadai Village 
Menlie Sangma Village 
Longyama Village
Oubudong Village
Buka Rida Village

See also
List of towns and villages in Tibet

References

Township-level divisions of Tibet
Populated places in Nagqu
Amdo County